Goddam may refer to:

 Adam Goddam (c. 1300–1358), English Franciscan theologian
 Goddam, the parody of Gollum in the book Bored of the Rings
 les goddams, a French ethnic slur for English people

See also
 Godam
 Goddamn (disambiguation)
 Mississippi Goddam, a song written and performed by American singer and pianist Nina Simone